"Don't Go Now" is a single by Australian indie pop band Ratcat, released in April 1991. It went peaked at  1 in Australia, becoming their second number-one single after the Tingles extended play (EP). Nick Mainsbridge was nominated for Engineer of the Year at the ARIA Music Awards of 1992 for "Don't Go Now".

Track listing
 CD single (rooArt 878 861-2)
 "Don't Go Now" – 3:13
 "The Lie" – 2:53
 "Midnight" – 1:42

Charts
On Australia's ARIA Singles Chart, "Don't Go Now" debuted at No. 8 and peaked at No. 1 six weeks later, spending 13 weeks in the top 50.

Weekly charts

Year-end charts

Certifications

Release history

See also
 List of number-one singles in Australia during the 1990s

References

1991 songs
1991 singles
Number-one singles in Australia